Synnøve Solbakken or Synnöve Solbakken may refer to:

Novel
 Synnøve Solbakken (novel), 1857 Norwegian peasant novel by Bjørnstjerne Bjørnson

Films based on the novel
 Synnöve Solbakken (1919 film), Swedish silent film
 Synnöve Solbakken (1934 film), Swedish film
 Synnöve Solbakken (1957 film), Swedish film

Other
 Synnøve Solbakken (politician) (born 1957), Norwegian politician